"Mother Trudy" (German: Frau Trude) is a German fairy tale collected by the Brothers Grimm, tale number 43. It is Aarne-Thompson type 334, at the witch's house.

Plot
A willful little girl will not obey her parents and, having taken it into her head that she wants to see Frau Trude, goes in spite of all their warnings.  She arrives terrified, and Frau Trude questions her.  She tells of seeing a black man on her steps (a collier, says Frau Trude), a green man (a huntsman), a red man (a butcher), and, looking through her window, the devil instead of Frau Trude.

Frau Trude says she saw the witch in her proper attire, and that she had been waiting for the girl.  She turned her into a block of wood and threw her onto the fire, and then warmed herself by it, commenting on how bright the block made the fire.

Commentary
The tale is unusual in that the evil witch triumphs in the end; the child is defeated. However, a common  theme in Grimm tales is that children who do not obey their parents are punished, making it a signature Grimm story.

See also

Hansel and Gretel
Vasilissa the Beautiful
The Willful Child

References

External links
Frau Trude, alt translation

Grimms' Fairy Tales
Witchcraft in fairy tales
ATU 300-399